Kuruvinatham is a village  in Bahour Commune of Bahour taluk in the Union Territory of Puducherry, India. Kuruvinatham serves as a gateway for all buses going between Villupuram - Cuddalore via Thirubuvanai. It lies on the southwestern tip of Bahour Enclave of Puducherry district.

Geography
Kuruvinatham is bordered by Thirupanampakkam village of Tamil nadu in the west, Karaimedu village of Tamil nadu in the north, Bahour and Parikkalpattu in the east and Soriyankuppam in the south.

Road Network
Kuruvinatham is connected to Bahour, its Commune Headquarters, by RC-33 road. Cuddalore-Pallinelliyanur Major District Road (MDR) passes through Kuruvinatham. Buses plying between Puducherry and Soriyankuppam connects Kuruvinatham. Also Cuddalore-Villupuram bus plying via Bahour connects Kuruvinatham.

Gallery

Politics
Kuruvinatham was once a Union Territory Assembly constituency. After Delimitation 2005, Kuruvinatham constituency was abolished and is made as a part of Bahour (Union Territory Assembly constituency) which comes under Puducherry (Lok Sabha constituency)

References

External links
Official website of the Government of the Union Territory of Puducherry

Villages in Puducherry district